Greater Los Angeles has a complex multimodal transportation infrastructure, which serves as a regional, national and international hub for passenger and freight traffic. The transportation system of Greater Los Angeles includes the United States' largest port complex, seven commuter rail lines, Amtrak service, a subway system within the city of Los Angeles, and numerous highways. Los Angeles is integrated into the Interstate Highway System by Interstate 5, Interstate 10, and Interstate 15, along with numerous auxiliary highways and state routes. Bus service is also included locally within the area by numerous local government agencies. Subways and light commuter rail lines are present within Los Angeles proper, allowing mass transportation within the city. Commuter railroads are run by Metrolink. Amtrak has numerous railroad lines that connect Los Angeles to the rest of the country.

Rail

Local Rail Services

Metrolink

As Greater Los Angeles' main commuter rail service, Metrolink runs seven lines through Southern California.

 91/Perris Valley Line (83.8 mile route between Union Station and Perris–South)
 Antelope Valley Line (76.6 mile route between Union Station and Lancaster)
 Inland Empire–Orange County (IEOC) Line (100.1 mile route between San Bernardino and Oceanside)
 Orange County Line (87.2 mile route between Union Station and Oceanside)
 Riverside Line (59.1 mile route between Union Station and Riverside–Downtown)
 San Bernardino Line (61.5 mile route between Union Station and San Bernardino/Riverside–Downtown)
 Ventura County Line (70.9 mile route between Union Station and Montalvo, Ventura)

Los Angeles County Metro Rail

The Los Angeles County Metro Rail is a light rail and subway system that serves primarily Los Angeles and its surrounding cities. There are several routes associated to this system, which follows:

 The Metro A Line  (opened in 1990 as the Blue Line) is a light rail line running between 7th Street/Metro Center station in Downtown Los Angeles and Downtown Long Beach station in Downtown Long Beach. It is the first of the MTA's modern rail lines since the 1961 demise of the Pacific Electric Railway's Red Car system.
 The Metro B Line is a subway line running between Union Station in Downtown Los Angeles and North Hollywood station in North Hollywood. The first leg opened as the Red Line to Westlake/MacArthur Park in 1993, to Hollywood in 1999, and to North Hollywood in 2000.
 The Metro C Line (opened in 1995 as the Green Line) is a light rail line running between Redondo Beach station in the South Bay region of Los Angeles and the Norwalk station in Norwalk. The line operates mostly in the median of the Century Freeway (Interstate 105). It offers indirect access to Los Angeles International Airport via a shuttle bus from the Aviation/I-105 station. It is the region's only above-ground light rail line that is completely grade separated.
 The Metro L Line (opened in 2003 as the Gold Line) is a light rail line that runs between Union Station in Downtown Los Angeles and APU/Citrus College station in Azusa and runs through Highland Park and Pasadena. Portions run elevated, below ground, in city streets, and in the median of a freeway.
 The Metro D Line (named the Purple Line in 2006; first leg to Westlake/MacArthur Park opened in 1993; to Koreatown in 1996) is a subway line running between Union Station in Downtown Los Angeles and Wilshire/Western station in the Koreatown neighborhood of Los Angeles Mid-Wilshire district. It was considered a branch of the Red Line prior to 2006.
 The Metro E Line (opened in 2012 as the Expo Line) is a light rail line running between 7th Street/Metro Center station in Downtown Los Angeles and Downtown Santa Monica station in Santa Monica. The first phase of the line to Culver City opened in 2012, and the second phase to Santa Monica opened in 2016. 
 The Metro K Line (opened in 2022) is a light rail line running between Westchester/Veterans station in Westchester and Expo/Crenshaw station in the Jefferson Park neighborhood of South Los Angeles, where it connects with the E Line. The line passes through the city of Inglewood and through various neighborhoods in the South Los Angeles region. A connection to the C Line will open in late 2023 and a connection to the to LAX Automated People Mover will open in 2024.

Linking Rail Services

Amtrak California Pacific Surfliner

The Pacific Surfliner is a 350-mile (563 km) Amtrak passenger train route serving communities on the coast of Southern California between San Diego and San Luis Obispo.

Amtrak Coast Starlight

The Coast Starlight is a 1,389-mile (2,235 km) passenger train route operated by Amtrak on the West Coast of the United States. It runs from Seattle, Washington's King Street Station to Los Angeles, California's Union Station.

Amtrak Southwest Chief

The Southwest Chief (formerly the Southwest Limited) is a passenger train operated by Amtrak along a 2256-mile (3631-km) route through the Midwestern and Southwestern United States. It runs from Chicago, Illinois, to Los Angeles, California, passing through Illinois, Iowa, Missouri, Kansas, Colorado, New Mexico, Arizona, and California.

Amtrak Sunset Limited

The Sunset Limited is a passenger train that for most of its history has run between New Orleans and Los Angeles, California, and that from early 1993 through late August 2005 also ran east of New Orleans to Florida, making it during that time the only true transcontinental passenger train in American history (ignoring, of course, the comparatively small gaps between its endpoint stations and the respective seacoasts).

Amtrak Texas Eagle

The Texas Eagle is a 1306-mile (2102 km) passenger train route operated by Amtrak in the central and western United States. Trains run daily between Chicago, Illinois, and San Antonio, Texas, and continue to Los Angeles, California, 2728 miles (4390 km) total, three days a week (incorporated as part of the Sunset Limited).

Bus
Buses in Greater Los Angeles are provided by several governmental entities, including Los Angeles County Metropolitan Transportation Authority, Orange County Transportation Authority (OCTA), Riverside Transit Agency, Omnitrans (San Bernardino County), and Gold Coast Transit (Ventura County).

Road

Public roads
The Greater Los Angeles area operates on a very extensive network of public roadways that allows vehicle drivers convenient direct access to all practical destinations in the area.

Major Freeways leading into and out of Greater Los Angeles Area
Interstate 5 southbound to Tijuana in Baja California, Mexico, northbound to the Central Valley
John J. Montgomery Freeway from U.S.-Mexico border crossing at San Ysidro, California to Downtown San Diego
San Diego Freeway from Downtown San Diego to the El Toro Y
Santa Ana Freeway from the El Toro Y to the East L.A. Interchange
Golden State Freeway from the East L.A. Interchange to Wheeler Ridge, California
Interstate 10 west terminus at Santa Monica, California, eastbound to the Arizona State Line
Santa Monica Freeway from Santa Monica, California to the East L.A. Interchange
San Bernardino Freeway from the East L.A. Interchange to San Bernardino, California
Interstate 15 south terminus in Barrio Logan in San Diego, northbound to the Nevada State Line
Temecula Valley Freeway from the San Diego County Line to Lake Elsinore
Corona Freeway from Lake Elsinore to Corona
Ontario Freeway from Corona to Devore
Mojave Freeway from Devore to the Nevada State Line
Interstate 40 west terminus in Barstow, California, eastbound to the Arizona State Line
Needles Freeway
U.S. Route 101 south terminus at the East L.A. Interchange, westbound to Santa Barbara, California then northbound to the Central Coast of California
Santa Ana Freeway from the East L.A. Interchange to the Four Level Interchange
Hollywood Freeway from the Four Level Interchange to the junction with the Ventura Freeway
Ventura Freeway from the junction with the Hollywood Freeway to Seacliff, California
State Route 14, south terminus at the Newhall Pass Interchange, northbound to Bishop, California via U.S. Route 395
Antelope Valley Freeway from the Newhall Pass Interchange to Mojave, California

Greater Los Angeles Freeways
State Route 1
freeway stub in Dana Point, leading north from Interstate 5
freeway stub east of Oxnard
State Route 2
Glendale Freeway from Silver Lake to junction with State Route 134 in Glendale, California
Frank D. Lanterman Freeway from junction with State Route 134 to La Cañada-Flintridge
Interstate 5
San Diego Freeway from San Diego to the El Toro Y in Irvine
Santa Ana Freeway from the El Toro Y in Irvine to the East L.A. Interchange
Golden State Freeway from the East L.A. Interchange to Wheeler Ridge, California in Kern County
Interstate 10
Santa Monica Freeway from Santa Monica to the East L.A. Interchange
San Bernardino Freeway from the East L.A. Interchange to San Bernardino, California
State Route 14
Antelope Valley Freeway from Sylmar to Mojave, California in Kern County
Interstate 15
Temecula Valley Freeway from San Diego County line to Lake Elsinore
Corona Freeway from Lake Elsinore to Corona
Ontario Freeway from Corona to Devore
Mojave Freeway from Devore to the Nevada State Line
State Route 22
7th Street freeway stub from Long Beach, California to Los Alamitos, California at the Interstate 405 and Interstate 605 interchange
Garden Grove Freeway from Westminster, California to Orange, California
State Route 23
Moorpark Freeway from Newberry Springs, California to Moorpark, California
State Route 33
Ojai Freeway from Ventura, California to Foster Park, California
Interstate 40
Needles Freeway from Barstow, California to the Arizona State Line
State Route 47
Vincent Thomas Bridge connecting San Pedro to Terminal Island
Terminal Island Freeway from Seaside Ave to Henry Ford Ave exit (splitting off from State Route 103
State Route 55
Costa Mesa Freeway, formerly Newport Freeway from Costa Mesa to Anaheim
State Route 57
Orange Freeway from the Orange Crush interchange to San Dimas, California
State Route 58
freeway stub west from Barstow, California
State Route 60
Pomona Freeway from the East L.A. Interchange to Riverside, California
Moreno Valley Freeway from Riverside, California to the junction with Interstate 10
State Route 71
Chino Valley Freeway from just north of State Route 91 to State Route 60
freeway stub from the Kellogg Interchange leading to the Corona Expressway
State Route 73
Corona del Mar Freeway from Costa Mesa to Irvine
San Joaquin Hills Toll Road from Irvine to Laguna Niguel
State Route 90
Marina Freeway freeway stub east and west of the Interstate 405 near Marina del Rey
Richard M. Nixon Parkway freeway stub west from just north of State Route 91 in Yorba Linda
State Route 91
Gardena Freeway from Interstate 110 in Gardena to Artesia
Artesia Freeway from Artesia to Fullerton at Interstate 5
Riverside Freeway from Fullerton at Interstate 5 to Riverside, California
U.S. Route 101
Santa Ana Freeway from the East L.A. Interchange to the Four Level Interchange
Hollywood Freeway from the Four Level Interchange to the junction with State Route 134 and State Route 170
Ventura Freeway from the junction with State Route 134 and State Route 170 to Seacliff, California just west of Ventura
State Route 103
Terminal Island Freeway co-signed from Seaside Avenue with State Route 47 to Sepulveda Blvd/Willow Street in Long Beach
Interstate 105
Glenn Anderson Freeway, more commonly known as the Century Freeway from El Segundo to Norwalk
Interstate 110
Harbor Freeway from San Pedro, California to Downtown L.A. at the interchange with the Santa Monica Freeway
State Route 110
Harbor Freeway from the interchange with the Santa Monica Freeway to the Four Level Interchange
Pasadena Freeway from the Four Level Interchange to Pasadena, California
State Route 118
Ronald Reagan Freeway, also known as the Simi Valley-San Fernando Valley Freeway, or more simply, the Simi Valley Freeway from Moorpark to San Fernando
State Route 133
Laguna Freeway from just south of Interstate 405 to Interstate 5
Eastern Transportation Corridor from Interstate 5 to State Route 241
State Route 134
Ventura Freeway from the junction with the Hollywood Freeway in Universal City to Pasadena 
State Route 138
freeway stub east from Interstate 5 near Gorman
State Route 170
Hollywood Freeway from the interchange with the Ventura Freeway to the Golden State Freeway
Interstate 210 and State Route 210
Foothill Freeway from Sylmar to Redlands
Interstate 215
Escondido Freeway from Murrieta to Riverside
Riverside Freeway from Riverside to San Bernardino
Barstow Freeway from San Bernardino to Devore
State Route 241
Foothill Transportation Corridor from Oso Parkway to the Eastern Transportation Corridor
Eastern Transportation Corridor from the Foothill Transportation Corridor to the Riverside Freeway
State Route 261
Eastern Transportation Corridor from Jamboree Road near the Santa Ana Freeway to State Route 241
Interstate 405
San Diego Freeway from the El Toro Y in Irvine to San Fernando
Interstate 605
San Gabriel River Freeway from Los Alamitos to Duarte
Interstate 710
Long Beach Freeway from Long Beach to Valley Blvd. in Alhambra
freeway stub south from the Foothill Freeway (unsigned SR 710)

Air

The Greater Los Angeles Area is serviced by 4 major airports and several minor airports. Los Angeles International (LAX), while LA/Ontario International and John Wayne Airport serves as overflow to LAX.
The region is also serviced by Long Beach Airport, Hollywood Burbank Airport, Palm Springs International Airport, San Bernardino International Airport,  and Palmdale Airport.

Ferry
Santa Catalina Island is served by several ferry lines with regular daily service to Newport Beach, San Pedro, Long Beach, Marina del Rey, and Dana Point. One such line is Catalina Express.

See also

References
 Official Metrolink Web site
 Official Metro website
 Official Los Angeles International Airport site
 Official LA/Ontario International Airport site
 Official John Wayne Airport-Orange County site
 Amtrak
 Orange County Transportation Agency

See also
Transportation of Los Angeles

Greater Los Angeles
Transportation in Los Angeles